The Sierra Leone national basketball team represents Sierra Leone in international men's basketball competitions and is controlled by the Sierra Leone National Basketball Federation. The squad is mostly home-based, with a few foreign-based players.

In 2001 British born Alex Fuhrmann was named as head coach after coaching club YSC to a title run in the countries national league cup and league (This team line-up featured head coach Ali Hijazi). Fuhrmann left the post after several months due to difficulties in gaining a place in the African Championships. From March 2017 onwards, Irish born Kane O'Leary became the head coach.

Current squad
Chris Bart-Williams (Tenerife Baloncesto – Spain) 
Trevor Turner (Cannon Royals – Sierra Leone)
Ahmed Dahniya (Cannon Royals – Sierra Leone)
Emmanuel Bassey (YSC – Sierra Leone) 
Ernest James Johnson (Cannon Royals – Sierra Leone)
Mobido Lymon (Wilberforce Breakers – Sierra Leone) 
Octavius Jackson (Cannon Royals – Sierra Leone)
Jerrold Hadson-Taylor (YSC – Sierra Leone) 
Muctar Kallay (YSC – Sierra Leone)
Osman Jalloh (Wilberforce Breakers- Sierra Leone)
Sam Brewah (YSC – Sierra Leone) 
Mamudu Lahai (YSC – Sierra Leone)
Head coach: Kane O'Leary

Notable players
Other current notable players from Sierra Leone:

Performance at international tournaments

Summer Olympics
yet to qualify

World championships
yet to qualify

FIBA Africa Championship
yet to qualify

African Games

yet to qualify

Commonwealth Games

never participated

Miscellaneous
Team Sierra Leone gained some international attention as one of Germany's major basketball utility suppliers Kickz featured the Freetown Collection and has since sponsored Sierra Leone's national team. Some of the collection was featured in the well known SLAM Magazine. Kickz took inspiration from Sierra Leone for various styles and schemes. According to its own publication, the company takes some of its profits back to the basketball team of Sierra Leone. The company designed the official logo for the Sierra Leone National Basketball Federation.

References

External links
Sierra Leone Basketball at Africabasket.com
Presentation on Facebook

Men's national basketball teams
Basketball in Sierra Leone
Basketball
1991 establishments in Sierra Leone